The 1946 Thiel Tomcats football team was an American football team that represented Thiel College in Greenville, Pennsylvania, as an independent during the 1946 college football season. In their eleventh year under head coach Jack Stoeber, the Tomcats compiled a perfect 7–0 record and outscored opponents by a total of 88 to 33. The team played its home game at Packard Field in Greenville, Pennsylvania.

In the fall of 1946, Thiel College had a total enrollment of only 450 students with 30 of them playing for the football team. The players had an average weight of between 165 and 170 pounds, and all but two of them were World War II veterans. Thirteen of the 30 players were locals from Greenville, and only two were from out of state. In describing the strength of the squad, Coach Stoeber emphasized teamwork over raw talent: "Although I have a squad of 30, the quality is not too good, and there are no outstanding individuals. The boys play together, and that is the answer for our good season."

The 1941 Thiel team also compiled an undefeated record, but the football program ceased competition during World War II. After a four-year hiatus, six players from the 1941 team returned to the 1946 team, including Joe DeFebo who served as an assistant coach. In all, Thiel won 15 consecutive games from 1941 to 1948.

In 1981, the team was inducted into the Thiel Athletic Hall of Fame. In its memorial to the 1946 team, Thiel Athletics note that "the 1946 team was forced to claw its way through", squeaking out narrow wins in a series of "cliff-hangers".

Schedule

Roster
 Sam Scava
 Jim Trettle
 John Bright
 John Desport
 Paul Stegkamper
 David Spargo
 Jack Beer
 James Wallace
 Pete Battisti
 Emil Charles
 Carl Maurana
 Dale Bachman
 Richard Dennison
 Dom Ucchino
 Tony Fahl
 Burt Larsen
 Robert Himmelman
 Tony Donato
 George Dietrich, 
 William Peterson
 Dominic Benedetto
 John Vitale
 Robert Dell
 Robert Driscole
 James Miller
 James Nichol
 Guyton Thigpen
 Bob Henderson
 John Boliver
 Ralph Demi
 Robert Denniston

References

Thiel
Thiel Tomcats football seasons
College football undefeated seasons
Thiel Tomcats football